Ramakrishna Puram popularly known as R.K. Puram, is a residential colony in Delhi. Named after the saint Sri Ramakrishna, it houses many high-profile corporate houses.

History

Rama Krishna Puram area was built in the second phase of the extension of New Delhi. Construction of R K Puram started in the late 1950s by acquiring land from Munirka farmers. Developed by CPWD to south-West of Secretariat Building, its development continued until the 1970s, when R. K. Puram was established. It mostly contains double-storeyed housing blocks, with 2-3 bedrooms apartments for central government officers. Som Vihar, named after Maj Som Nath Sharma, Param Vir Chakra, came up in the mid-eighties as a cooperative housing society for defence forces officers under the aegis of the Army Welfare Housing Organisation, in what is sometimes referred to as Sector 10. Some high-rise apartment blocks like Nivedita Kunj for senior officers were added in the 1990s. Gradually markets were added in each pocket, and schools and places of worship were also built.  Today the area also house several houses of Government of India.

Landmarks
The area includes a number of important landmarks - Kendriya Vidyalaya, Sector 8, R.K Puram, Kerala School, Delhi in Sector-8, Rock Garden - Sector-7, Hope Hall Foundation School in Sector 7, Holy Child Auxilium School, Delhi Public School, R. K. Puram in Sector 12 and D.A.V. Public School in Sector-9, Delhi Karnataka Sangha- Sector-12, Karnataka Bank in Karnataka Sangha Building in Rao Tula Ram Marg in Sector-12,National Association Blind School and Tamil Sangam in Sector-5, Ramjas School, R. K. Puram, Delhi Tamil Education Association Senior Secondary Schools {D.T.E.A} and famed Yoga Centre named Shri Siddh Gufa Yoga Shikshan Kendra in Sector-4, Lal Bhadur Shastri School in Sector-3, Electronics shopping centre in Sector-6 (Mohan Singh Market), Malai Mandir in Sector-7 are a few of them. Also, Sangam cinema hall is now renovated completely with two PVR multiplex screens and a range of restaurants. The complex also has a Starbucks outlet. The area also includes Kendriya Vidyalaya RK Puram Sector 2 and Sector 4.

Each sector has an allocated space for a market complex comprising multiple shops.  Some of the prominent market complexes are:
 Sector 8 market - Famous for Supreme Bakery and a host of other shops ranging from mobile shops to departmental stores
 Sector 9 market - With Sangam Complex (PVR and Starbucks) and PPC.
 Sector 12 market 
 Sector 6, Mohan Singh market - Famous electronics shopping centre
 Sector 1 market - famous for its chemist shops

R. K. Puram is also famous for its two weekly markets. The Friday Market happens every Friday on the road connecting the Office Complex outside Sector-1 and Mohammadpur. The Sunday Market which takes place every Sunday takes up the entire road between Sector-6 and Sector-7. Both markets host stalls of all kinds including fruits and vegetables, spices, clothes, leather goods, kitchen utilities and so on. Prices are totally negotiable and customers bargaining with vendors have become a common sight. The weekly markets attract large crowds most of them belonging to the middle and lower economic groups .

Overview
It is one of the oldest and larger developments in Delhi built for housing Central Government employees.  It is roughly rectangular, enclosed by Ring Road to the north, Outer Ring Road to the south facing Vasant Vihar, Rao Tula Ram Marg to the west and Africa Avenue to the east.  The north-eastern corner of this area is a separate commercial centre called Madam Bhikaji Cama Place.

It is subdivided into 13 "Sectors" which are named numerically from 1 to 13. Sector-13 is the only sector located on the other side of the Ring Road. Surprisingly, RK Puram does not have a Sector-11.  All the sectors are characterised by wide colony roads, sprinkling of parks/common areas, excellent greenery and decent street lighting.

RK Puram also has its fair share of religious places including Ayyappa Temple in Sector-1, St Thomas Church in Sector - 2, Gurudwara in Sec-3, famed Yoga Centre named Shri Siddha Gufa Yog Shikshan Kendra, Gurudwara in Sector-5 and Jain Mandir in Sector - 4, Malai Mandir and Kali Bari temple in Sector - 7 and Venketeswer Temple, Masjid Haji Langa in Sector-3.  Apart from these, there are a number of temples, Gurudwaras, mosques and churches sprinkled across this area.

Connectivity
R. K. Puram is well connected to different parts of the city by buses of the Delhi Transport Corporation. Most common routes through R K Puram include:
  610 from Anand Parbat to R.K Puram
  624 from Munirka to Anand vihar
  336 from Munirka to vivek vihar terminal  
  623 from Vasant Vihar to Shahdara, 
  544 from Sector-1 R. K. Puram to Badarpur, 
  511 from Badarpur MB road to Dhaula kuan
  448 from Punjabi Bagh to Hamdard nagar
  578 from Safdarung Terminal to Najafgarh
  727 from Palam Gaon to JLN Stadium
  764 from Nehru Place to Najafgarh, 
  680 from Ambedkar Nagar to Secretariat Building, New Delhi, 
  711 from Janakpuri to Sarai Kale Khan, 
  611 from Dhaula Kuan to Mayur Vihar, 
  604 from Vasant Kunj to New Delhi Railway Station 
  621 from Purvanchal Hostel to Mori Gate 
  620 from Hauz Khas to Shivaji Stadium.
  623A from Vasant Vihar to Anand Vihar Bus Terminal.
  511 from Badarpur to Dhaula Kuan
  OMS
  TMS
A special bus service also plies from Sector-1 R. K. Puram to Gurgaon.

R. K. Puram lies on the Janakpuri-Botanical Garden line with a station at Munirka and on the Mukundpur-Yamuna Vihar line with a station at Sarojini Nagar, Bhikaji Cama Place and Moti Bagh station. Both Lines are well connected with   Delhi Metro Feeder Bus Service as well as DTC Buses. Now, Magenta line stations are operational and Pink Line is also operational now which facilitates to the R.K.Puram connecting it with INA. Lajpat Nagar with the Pink Line.

References 

Neighbourhoods in Delhi
1970s establishments in Delhi